The 2023 season is the 109th season in the existence of Clube Atlético Mineiro and the 17th consecutive season in the top flight of Brazilian football. In addition to the national league, Atlético Mineiro participate in this season's editions of the Campeonato Mineiro, the Copa do Brasil and the Copa Libertadores.

Players

First team squad

Other players with first team appearances

Transfers

In

Out

Transfer summary
Undisclosed fees are not included in the transfer totals.

Expenditure

Total:  €1,440,000

Income

Total:  €9,060,000

Net total

Total:  €7,620,000

Competitions

Overview

Campeonato Mineiro

First stage

Matches

Knockout stage

Semi-finals

Finals

Copa Libertadores

Second stage

Third stage

Group stage

Campeonato Brasileiro

Standings

Result by round

Matches

Copa do Brasil

Statistics

Squad appearances and goals
Last updated on 18 March 2023.

|-
! colspan="16" style="background:#dcdcdc; text-align:center"|Goalkeepers

|-
! colspan="16" style="background:#dcdcdc; text-align:center"|Defenders

|-
! colspan="16" style="background:#dcdcdc; text-align:center"|Midfielders

|-
! colspan="16" style="background:#dcdcdc; text-align:center"|Forwards

|-
! colspan=14 style=background:#dcdcdc; text-align:center|Players who have made an appearance this season but have left the club

|}

Notes

References

External links

Clube Atlético Mineiro seasons
Atlético Mineiro